Philip Charles Ciaccio (August 23, 1927 – November 12, 2015) was an American judge and politician. He served as a Democratic member for the 9th district of the Louisiana House of Representatives.

Life and career 
Ciaccio was born in New Orleans, Louisiana. He attended Brother Martin High School, graduating at the age of fifteen. Ciaccio also attended Tulane University, where he earned his law degree and undergraduate degree. He served in the United States Air Force during the Korean conflict.

In 1962, Ciaccio was elected to represent the 9th district of the Louisiana House of Representatives in a special election, succeeding Daniel L. Kelly. In 1966, he left office to represent district E of the New Orleans City Council, succeeding Kelly. In 1982, Ciaccio left office and was succeeded by Wayne Babovich. In the same year, he was appointed to serve as the judge of the Louisiana Circuit Courts of Appeal's fourth circuit, serving until 1998. He was also a lawyer.

Ciaccio died in November 2015, at the age of 88.

References 

1927 births
2015 deaths
Politicians from New Orleans
Brother Martin High School alumni
Tulane University alumni
Louisiana lawyers
Democratic Party members of the Louisiana House of Representatives
20th-century American politicians
New Orleans City Council members
Louisiana state court judges
Circuit court judges in the United States
20th-century American judges